

Finals ranking

Final

References
 

2000 FINA World Swimming Championships (25 m)